"You Do Something to Me" is a song by British singer-songwriter Paul Weller, released in 1995 as the third single from his solo album Stanley Road. It reached number nine on the UK Singles Chart. According to Weller, the song is about unattainable love.

Charts

Certifications

References

1995 singles
1995 songs
Song recordings produced by Brendan Lynch (music producer)
Songs written by Paul Weller